This list of gastropods described in the 2000s is a list of new species (and other new taxa) of gastropod mollusks (i.e. snails and slugs from saltwater, freshwater, and land) that were described for the first time in the scientific literature during the time span from the year 2000 to the year 2009.

The number of newly described gastropod is enormous. For example, in A Database of Western Atlantic Marine Mollusca (this includes all classes of molluscs, not only gastropods) there are 718 new records from this time span, which total unfortunately includes a number of synonyms.

2000

Marine species
According to the World Register of Marine Species, 395 new marine gastropod taxa were introduced by the scientific and amateur communities worldwide in the year 2000, including new species, genera, and higher taxa.

 Abyssochrysos xouthos Killeen & Oliver, 2000
Admetula afra Petit & Harasewych, 2000
Afer pseudofusinus Fraussen & Hadorn, 2000
Aldisa albatrossae Elwood, Valdés & Gosliner, 2000
Aldisa williamsi Elwood, Valdés & Gosliner, 2000
Alora kiiensis Nakayama, 2000
Amaea kushimotensis Nakayama, 2000
Amaea percancellata Nakayama, 2000 - recombined as Narvaliscala percancellata (Nakayama, 2000)
Andrusovia andrusovi Starobogatov, 2000
Andrusovia brusinai Starobogatov, 2000
Angaria lilianae Monsecour & Monsecour, 2000
Antillophos gemmulifer (Kilburn, 2000)
Auristomia barashi (Bogi & Galil, 2000)
Austrasiatica alexhuberti (Lorenz & Huber, 2000)
Belchatovia hydrobiopsis Kadolsky & Piechocki, 2000 †
Berthella aquitaniensis Valdés & Lozouet, 2000 †
Berthella ateles Valdés & Lozouet, 2000 †
Berthella canariensis Cervera, Gosliner, Garcia Gomez & Ortea, 2000 - a synonym of Berthella africana (Pruvot-Fol, 1953)
Cadlina georgiensis Schrödl, 2000
Caecum continens van der Linden & Moolenbeek, 2000
Caecum macrum van der Linden & Moolenbeek, 2000
Calliostoma dedonderi Vilvens, 2000
Calliostoma emmanueli Vilvens, 2000
Calliostoma houarti Vilvens, 2000
Calliostoma poppei Vilvens, 2000
Cassis patamakanthini Parth, 2000
Ceratia nagashima Fukuda, 2000
Chicoreus (Siratus) bessei Houart, 2000 - recombined as Siratus bessei (Houart, 2000)
Chicoreus (Siratus) hennequini Houart, 2000 - recombined as Siratus hennequini (Houart, 2000)
Chromodoris buchananae Gosliner & Behrens, 2000
Chrysallida carpinei Aartsen, Gittenberger & Goud, 2000
Chrysallida epitonoides Aartsen, Gittenberger E. & Goud, 2000
Chrysallida gitzelsi Aartsen, Gittenberger & Goud, 2000
Chrysallida hoenselaari Aartsen, Gittenberger & Goud, 2000
Chrysallida horii Aartsen, Gittenberger & Goud, 2000
Chrysallida mcmillanae Aartsen, Gittenberger & Goud, 2000
Chrysallida menkhorsti Aartsen, Gittenberger & Goud, 2000
Chrysallida turbonillaeformis Aartsen, Gittenberger & Goud, 2000
Chrysallida (Parthenina) dekkeri Aartsen, Gittenberger & Goud, 2000
Chrysallida (Parthenina) faberi Aartsen, Gittenberger & Goud, 2000
Chrysallida (Parthenina) feldi Aartsen, Gittenberger & Goud, 2000
Chrysallida (Parthenina) gabmulderi Aartsen, Gittenberger & Goud, 2000
Chrysallida (Parthenina) josae Aartsen, Gittenberger & Goud, 2000
Chrysallida (Parthenina) willeminae Aartsen, Gittenberger & Goud, 2000
Chrysallida (Pyrgulina) kempermani Aartsen, Gittenberger & Goud, 2000 - recombined as Pyrgulina kempermani (Aartsen, Gittenberger & Goud, 2000)
Chrysallida (Pyrgulina) vanderlindeni Aartsen, Gittenberger & Goud, 2000 - recombined as Pyrgulina vanderlindeni (Aartsen, Gittenberger & Goud, 2000)
Chrysallida (Trabecula) kronenbergi Aartsen, Gittenberger & Goud, 2000 - recombined as Trabecula kronenbergi (Aartsen, Gittenberger & Goud, 2000)
Cirsotrema amamiense Nakayama, 2000
Cirsotrema amplsum Nakayama, 2000
Cirsotrema bennettorum Garcia, 2000
Clanculus korkosi Singer, Mienis & Geiger, 2000
Clanculus richeri Vilvens, 2000
Claviscala nagaii Nakayama, 2000
Claviscala nodulosa Nakayama, 2000
Claviscala subulae Nakayama, 2000
Colubraria tchangsii Ma & Zhang, 2000
Colubraria tumida Ma & Zhang, 2000
Conus filmeri Rolán & Röckel, 2000
Conus flavusalbus Rolán & Röckel, 2000
Conus franciscoi Rolán & Röckel, 2000
Conus gabrielae Rolán & Röckel, 2000
Conus gordyi Röckel & Bondarev, 2000
Conus lucaya Petuch, 2000
Conus micropunctatus Rolán & Röckel, 2000
Conus moylani Delsaerdt, 2000
Conus theodorei Petuch, 2000
Conus trovaoi Rolán & Röckel, 2000
Copulabyssia riosi Leal & Simone, 2000
Coralliophila fontanangioyi Smriglio & Mariottini, 2000 - represented as Coralliophila fontanangioyae Smriglio & Mariottini, 2000
Coralliophila knudseni Smriglio & Mariottini, 2000
Coralliophila schioettei Smriglio & Mariottini, 2000
Crepidula argentina Simone, Pastorino & Penchaszadeh, 2000
Crepidula atrasolea Collin, 2000
Cuthona elenae (Martynov, 2000)
Cuthonella elenae Martynov, 2000 - recombined as Cuthona elenae (Martynov, 2000)
Cycloscala spinosa Nakayama, 2000
Cyerce orteai Valdés & Camacho-Garcia, 2000
Cymbiola (Cymbiola) malayensis Douté & Bail, 2000 - alternatively represented as   Cymbiola malayensis Douté & Bail, 2000
Cymbiola (Cymbiola) palawanica Douté & Bail, 2000 - alternatively represented as   Cymbiola palawanica Douté & Bail, 2000
Cymbiola malayensis Douté & Bail, 2000
Cymbiola palawanica Douté & Bail, 2000
Cypraecassis wilmae Kreipl & Alf, 2000
Daphniola louisi Falniowski & Szarowska, 2000
Dentimargo cruzmoralai Espinosa & Ortea, 2000
Dentimargo zaidettae Espinosa & Ortea, 2000
Distorsionella beui Riedel, 2000 - a synonym of Distorsionella lewisi (Beu, 1978)
Fusinus kazdailisi Fraussen & Hadorn, 2000 - recombined as Chryseofusus kazdailisi (Fraussen & Hadorn, 2000)
Halgerda batangas Carlson & Hoff, 2000
Halgerda johnsonorum Carlson & Hoff, 2000
Halgerda okinawa Carlson & Hoff, 2000
Latirus beckyae Snyder, 2000 - recombined as Hemipolygona beckyae (Snyder, 2000)
 Phyllidia koehleri Perrone, 20000
Rissoina onobiformis Rolán & Luque, 2000 - recombined as Ailinzebina onobiformis (Rolán & Luque, 2000)
Strombus praeraninus Kronenberg & Dekker, 2000 - nomen novum

Freshwater species
Alzoniella (Alzoniella) junqua Boeters, 2000
Alzoniella (Alzoniella) haicabia Boeters, 2000
Bythinella bertrandi Bernasconi, 2000
Bythinella jourdei Bernasconi, 2000
Bythinella lalindei Bernasconi, 2000 a synonym for Bythinella bicarinata
Bythinella pujolensis Bernasconi, 2000
Bythinella rondelaudi Bernasconi, 2000
Bythinella troyana Bernasconi, 2000
Bythinella vimperei Bernasconi, 2000
Contectiana (Contectiana) bazavlukensis Datsenko, 2000 † - recombined as Viviparus bazavlukensis (Datsenko, 2000)†

Terrestrial species

Albinaria latelamellaris Neubert, Örstan & Welter-Schultes, 2000
Anaglyphula minutissima Maassen, 2000
Deroceras dewinteri Maassen, 2000
Georissa pangianensis Maassen, 2000
Liardetia pseudojavanaMaassen, 2000
Microcystina clarkae Maassen, 2000
Philalanka pusilla Maassen, 2000
Ptychopatula solemi Maassen, 2000
Ptychopatula vermeuleni Maassen, 2000
Rahula moolenbeeki Maassen, 2000
Teracharopa goudi Maassen, 2000
Teracharopa rara Maassen, 2000
Tsoukatosia liae Gittenberger, 2000

Fossil species
 Sioliela ovata Wesselingh, 2000 †

Other taxa
 family Canterburyellidae Bandel, Gründel & Maxwell, 2000 †
 family Cortinellidae Bandel, 2000 †
 genus Belchatovia Kadolsky & Piechocki, 2000 †
 genus Benthodorbis Ponder & Avern, 2000
 genus Teracharopa Maassen, 2000
 genus Tsoukatosia Gittenberger, 2000
 subspecies Alzoniella (Alzoniella) perrisii irubensis Boeters, 2000
 subspecies Conus pennaceus tsara Korn, Niederhöfer & Blöcher, 2000 - a synonym of Conus pennaceus Born, 1778
 subspecies Conus pennaceus vezoi Korn, Niederhöfer & Blöcher, 2000
 subspecies Cypraeovula castanea latebrosa Swarts & Liltved in Liltved, 2000

2001 

New species
 Arinia jensi Maassen, 2001
 Arinia panhai Maassen, 2001
 Aukena endodonta Bouchet & Abdou, 2001 - extinct species from Gambier Islands. The subgenus Aukena H. B. Baker, 1940 elevated to genus level.
 Chicoreus (Siratus) guionetti Merle, Garrigues & Pointier, 2001
Aylacostoma ci Simone, 2001
 Bullata analuciae Souza & Coovert, 2001 
 Chicoreus monicae Bozzetti, 2001
 Chicoreus setionoi Houart, 2001
 Chicoreus vokesae Macsotay & Campos, 2001
 Circassina lasistana Hausdorf, 2001
 Circassina pergranulata Hausdorf, 2001
 Circassina septentrionalis Hausdorf, 2001
Conus anabelae Rolán & Röckel, 2001
Conus babaensis Rolán & Röckel, 2001
Conus empressae Lorenz, 2001
Conus tenuilineatus Rolán & Röckel, 2001
 Ena menkhorsti Hausdorf & Bank, 2001
Doryssa ipupiara Simone, 2001
 Ena dazimonensis Hausdorf & Bank, 2001
 Epitonium oliverioi Bonfitto & Sabelli, 2001
 Ercolania selva Ortea & Espinosa, 2001
 Kessneria papillosa Walker & Ponder, 2001
 Opisthostoma christae Maassen, 2001
Parviturbo rolani Engl, 2001
 Rostanga elandsia Garovoy, Valdés & Gosliner, 2001
 Rostanga aureamala Garovoy, Valdés & Gosliner, 2001
 Rostanga phepha Garovoy, Valdés & Gosliner, 2001
 Thais keluo Tan & Liu, 2001
Other taxa
 tribe Spirovallini Waterhouse, 2001 of the family Eotomariidae

2002 
New species
 Afroturbonilla multitudinalis Peñas & Rolán, 2002
 Brotia praetermissa Köhler & Glaubrecht, 2002
 Buccinum thermophilum Harasewych & Kantor, 2002
 Bythinella bouloti Girardi, Bichain & Wienin, 2002
 Bythinella galerae Girardi, Bichain & Wienin, 2002
 Bythinella wawrzineki Bernasconi, 2002
 Calma gobioophaga Calado & Urgorri, 2002
 Chicoreus guionneti Merle, Garrigues & Pointier, 2002
 Chrysallida annobonensis Peñas & Rolán, 2002
 Chrysallida ryalli Peñas & Rolán, 2002
 Coccoderma semmelinki Maassen, 2002
 Curvella myrmecophila Verdcourt, 2002
 Curvella usambarica Verdcourt, 2002
 Diaphana haini Linse & Schiøtte, 2002
 Diplommatina abundans Maassen, 2002 
 Diplommatina carinaspinosa Maassen, 2002
 Diplommatina gatudensis Maassen, 2002
 Diplommatina karoensis Maassen, 2002
 Diplommatina vanderblommi Maassen, 2002
 Diplommatina wilhelminae Maassen, 2002
 Eremopyrgus elegans Hershler, Liu & Landye 2002
 Eulimella juliae Peñas & Rolán, 2002
 Graphis barashi Van Aartsen, 2002 
 Haemiphaedusa (Selenophaedusa) bavayi Nordiseck, 2002
 Macedonica pindica Gittenberger, 2002
Margarites imperialis Simone & Birman, 2002
Margarites mirabilis Simone & Birman, 2002
 Megastomia troncosoi Peñas & Rolán, 2002
 Montenegrina dennisi Gittenberger, 2002
 Ondina fragilissima Peñas & Rolán, 2002
 Opisthostoma banki Maassen, 2002
 Opisthostoma clerxi 
 Opisthostoma secretum Maassen, 2002
 Palaina reederi Maassen, 2002
 Plecostoma kitteli Maassen, 2002
 Syrnola arae Peñas & Rolán, 2002
 Turbonilla goudi Peñas & Rolán, 2002
 Turbonilla jordii Peñas & Rolán, 2002
 Turbonilla lozoueti Peñas & Rolán, 2002
 Turbonilla parsysti Peñas & Rolán, 2002
 Turbonilla coseli Peñas & Rolán, 2002

Fossil species
 Aporrhais dingdenensis Marquet, Grigis & Landau, 2002

Other taxa
 genus Loosjesia Nordiseck, 2002
 subgenus Cylindrophaedusa (Montiphaedusa) Nordiseck, 2002
 subgenus Dautzenbergiella (Mansuyia) Nordiseck, 2002
 subgenus Hemiphaedusa (Dendrophaedusa) Nordiseck, 2002
 subgenus Juttingia (Pseudohemiphaedusa) Nordiseck, 2002
 subspecies Idyla castalia yeruni Gittenberger, 2002
 subspecies Macedonica pindica bellula Gittenberger, 2002
 subspecies Macedonica pindica pindica Gittenberger, 2002
 subspecies Macedonica janinensis maasseni Gittenberger, 2002
 subspecies Montenegrina dennisi dennisi Gittenberger, 2002
 subspecies Montenegrina dennisi protruda Gittenberger, 2002

2003 

New species
 Benthobia atafona Simone, 2003
 Benthobia complexirhyna Simone, 2003
 Benthobia sima Simone, 2003
 Benthobia tornatilis Simone, 2003
 Bythinella geisserti Boeters & Falkner, 2003
 Gabbia campícola Ponder, 2003
 Gabbia kendricki Ponder, 2003
 Gabbia pallidula Ponder, 2003
 Gabbia davisi Ponder, 2003
 Gabbia napierensis Ponder, 2003
 Gabbia rotunda Ponder, 2003
 Gabbia Fontana Ponder, 2003
 Gabbia obesa Ponder, 2003
 Gabbia túmida Ponder, 2003
 Gabbia kessneri Ponder, 2003
 Gabbia beecheyi Ponder, 2003
 Gabbia microcosta Ponder, 2003
 Gabbia adusta Ponder, 2003
 Gabbia lutaria Ponder, 2003
 Gabbia clathrata Ponder, 2003
 Gabbia spiralis Ponder, 2003
 Gabbia carinata Ponder, 2003
 Hirtudiscus boyacensis Hausdorf, 2003
 Hirtudiscus comatus Hausdorf, 2003
 Hirtudiscus curei Hausdorf, 2003
 Phyllodesmium parangatum Ortiz & Gosliner, 2003
 Tritonia bollandi Smith & Gosliner, 2003
 Tylomelania bakara Von Rintelen & Glaubrecht, 2003
 Tylomelania kruimeli Von Rintelen & Glaubrecht, 2003
 Tylomelania helmuti Von Rintelen & Glaubrecht, 2003

Other taxa
 subfamily Depressizoninae Geiger, 2003. It was considered a synonym of Scissurellinae according to Bouchet & Rocroi 2005, but in 2009 it was updated to family level Depressizonidae.
 tribe Bistolidini C. Meyer, 2003 in the Cypraeidae
 tribe Isandini Hickman, 2003 in the Umboiniinae, Trochidae.
 genus Contradusta Meyer, 2003
 genus Cryptocypraea Meyer, 2003
 genus Jagora Köhler & Glaubrecht, 2003
 genus Palmulacypraea Meyer, 2003

2004 

New species
 Amphidromus protania Lehmann & Maassen, 2004
 Calyptraea africana Rolán, 2004
 Calyptraea inexpectata Rolán, 2004
 Chicoreus allaryi Houart, Quiquandon & Briano, 2004
 Cochlostoma (Titanopoma) fuchsi Fehér, 2004
 Cochlostoma (Titanopoma) pinteri Fehér, 2004
 Crepidula cachimilla Cledón, Simone & Penchaszadeh, 2004
 Euxina patrisnemethi Németh & Szekeres, 2004
 Gulella herberti Van Bruggen, 2004
 Harmozica occidentalis Hausdorf, 2004
 Incidostoma tupy Simone, 2004
 Pravispira subserrulata Németh & Szekeres, 2004
 Orculella astirakiensis Gittenberger & Hausdorf, 2004
 Orculella creantirudis Gittenberger & Hausdorf, 2004
 Orculella creticostata Gittenberger & Hausdorf, 2004
 Orculella cretimaxima Gittenberger & Hausdorf, 2004
 Orculella cretiminuta Gittenberger & Hausdorf, 2004
 Orculella cretilasithi Gittenberger & Hausdorf, 2004
 Orculella cretioreina Gittenberger & Hausdorf, 2004
 Orculella diensis Gittenberger & Hausdorf, 2004
 Orculella fodela Gittenberger & Hausdorf, 2004
 Orculella franciscoi Gittenberger & Hausdorf, 2004
 Orculella scalaris Gittenberger & Hausdorf, 2004
 Phyllodesmium jakobsenae Burghardt & Wägele, 2004
 Pomacea curumim Simone, 2004
Radiodiscus promatensis Miquel, Ramírez & Thomé, 2004
 Vitrea vereae Irikov, Georgiev & Riedel, 2004
Zilchogyra zulmae Miquel, Ramírez & Thomé, 2004

from Visaya 1(1):
 Calliostoma guphili
 Calliostoma philippei
 Calliostoma vilvensi
 Tectus magnificus
 Cypraea leucodon leucodon forma escotio - new form
 Conus frausseni
 Conus grohi
 Conus terryni
 Engina ignicula
 Nassaria perlata

from Visaya 1(2):
 Conus medoci
 Conus chiapponorum
 Conus vulcanus
 Conus claudiae
 Conus isabelarum
 Conus crioulus
 Conus suduirauti
 Physella winnipegensis

Other taxa

 genus Borlumastus Örstan & Yildirim, 2004
 subspecies Albinaria eburnea inflaticollis Nordsieck
 subspecies Albinaria eburnea samariae Nordsieck
 subspecies Albinaria troglodytes niproensis Nordsieck
 subspecies Albinaria troglodytes strictecostata Nordsieck
 subspecies Albinaria virginea gavdopoulensis Nordsieck
 subspecies Albinaria virginea litoralis Nordsieck
 subspecies Cochlostoma (Titanopoma) auritum gjonii Fehér, 2004
 subspecies Cochlostoma (Titanopoma) hoyeri csikii Fehér, 2004
 subspecies Cochlostoma (Titanopoma) hoyeri lillae Fehér, 2004
 subspecies Cochlostoma (Titanopoma) pinteri erossi Fehér, 2004
 subspecies Cochlostoma (Titanopoma) pinteri hanswagneri Fehér, 2004
 subspecies Cochlostoma (Titanopoma) pinteri pinteri Fehér, 2004

2005 

New species
Anachis ryalli Rolán, 2005
Caecum rehderi Raines & Pizzini, 2005
Caecum heterochromum Raines & Pizzini, 2005
Caecum pascuanum Raines & Pizzini, 2005
Caecum rapanuiense Raines & Pizzini, 2005
Caecum campanulatum Raines & Pizzini, 2005
 Chicoreus franchii Cossignani, 2005
 Codringtonia elisabethae Subai, 2005
 Codringtonia gittenbergeri Subai, 2005
 Codringtonia helenae Subai, 2005
 Conus escondidai Poppe & Tagaro, 2005
 Cypraea hungerfordi lovetha Poppe, Tagaro & Buijse, 2005 - new subspecies
 Dentarene rosadoi Bozzetti & Ferrario, 2005
 Dentiovula lissenungensis Lorenz, 2005
 Dolichupis virgo Fehse & Grego, 2005
 Engina goncalvesi Coltro, 2005
 Engina janowskyi Coltro, 2005
 Fasciolaria agatha Simone & Abbate, 2005
Fusinus satsumaensis Hadorn & Chino, 2005
 Guildfordia superba Poppe, Tagaro & Dekker, 2005
Haplocochlias ortizi Espinosa, Oreta & Fernández-Garcés, 2005
 Janoliva amoni (Sterba & Lorenz, 2005) - Olivella amoni Sterba & Lorenz, 2005
 Lilloiconcha costulata Hausdorf, 2005
 Lilloiconcha laevigata Hausdorf, 2005
Lodderena bunnelli Redfern & Rolán, 2005
Mitrella aemulata Rolán, 2005
Mitrella africana Rolán, 2005
Mitrella annobonensis Rolán, 2005
Mitrella condei Rolán, 2005
Mitrella fimbriata Pelorce & Boyer, 2005
Mitrella hernandezi Boyer & Rolán, 2005
Mitrella inesitae Rolán, 2005
Mitrella inflata Pelorce & Boyer, 2005
Mitrella saotomensis Rolán, 2005
Mitrella tenebrosa Rolán, 2005
Nassarina procera Pelorce & Boyer, 2005
Nassarina rolani Pelorce & Boyer, 2005
 Niveria brasilica Fehse & Grego, 2005
 Notovoluta gerondiosi Bail & Limpus, 2005
Patelloida ryukyuensis Nakano & Ozawa, 2005
 Perotrochus tosatoi Anseeuw, Goto & Abdi, 2005
 Pisania rosadoi Bozzetti & Ferrario, 2005
 Pusula macaeica Fehse & Grego, 2005
 Robertsiella silvicola Attwood, Lokman & Ong, 2005
 Rostellariella lorenzi Morrison, 2005
Tambja gabrielae Pola, Cervera & Gosliner, 2005
Tambja tentaculata Pola, Cervera & Gosliner, 2005
Tambja victoriae Pola, Cervera & Gosliner, 2005
Tambja zulu Pola, Cervera & Gosliner, 2005
 Tonna hardyi Bozzetti & Ferrario, 2005

Other taxa:
 subspecies Zoila friendii marina Kostin, 2005 - new subspecies
 subspecies Conus betulinus rufoluteus Bozzetti & Ferrario, 2005

2006 

New species
 Alcadia novogranadensis Hausdorf, 2006
 Amphidromus inversus albulus Sutcharit & Panha, 2006
Angaria nhatrangensis  Dekker, 2006
 Apameaus apameae Sivan, Heller & van Damme, 2006
 Astraea danieli Alf & Kreipl, 2006
 Bathylepeta linseae Schwabe, 2006
 Bayerotrochus philpoppei Anseeuw, Poppe & Goto, 2006
 Conassiminea studderti Fukuda & Ponder, 2006
 Conassiminea zheni Fukuda & Ponder, 2006
 Crenilabium birmani Simone, 2006
Crepidula carioca Simone, 2006
 Crepidula margarita Simone, 2006
 Crepidula intratesta Simone, 2006
 Crepidula pyguaia Simone, 2006
Epiphragmophora guevarai Cuezzo, 2006
Epiphragmophora quirogai Cuezzo, 2006
Epiphragmophora walshi Cuezzo, 2006
 Gaza compta Simone & Cunha, 2006
 Hypselodoris lilyeveae Alejandrino & Valdés 2006
 Inella unicornium Simone, 2006
 Iphinopsis splendens Simone & Birman, 2006
Lucapina elisae Costa & Simone, 2006
 Margarites mirabilis Simone & Birman, 2006
 Margarites imperialis Simone & Birman, 2006
 Phyllodesmium rudmani Burghardt & Gosliner, 2006
 Taylorconcha insperata Hershler, 2006
 Tritonia dantarti Ballesteros & Avila, 2006
Other taxa

 genus Apameaus Sivan, Heller & van Damme, 2006

2007 

New species
Alderia willowi Krug et al., 2007
Angaria carmencita Günther, 2007
 Bithynia canyamelensis Altaba, 2007
 Bithynia manonellesi Altaba, 2007
 Bithynia pauli Altaba, 2007
 Bithynia riddifordi Altaba, 2007
 Chicoreus pisori Houart, 2007
 Columbella costa Simone, 2007
 Costasiella coronata Swennen, 2007
 Ercolania kencolesi Grzymbowski, Stemmer & Wagele, 2007
 Georissa filiasaulae Haase & Schilthuizen, 2007
 Gerdiella alvesi Lima, Barros & Petit, 2007
 Gyraulus pamphylicus Glöer & Rähle, 2007
 Islamia laiae Altaba, 2007
Lirabuccinum musculus Callomon & Lawless, 2007 
 Oxychilus albuferensis Altaba, 2007
 Oxychilus yartanicus Altaba, 2007
 Paracrostoma martini Köhler & Glaubrecht, 2007
 Paracrostoma tigrina Köhler & Glaubrecht, 2007
 Phaedusa timorensis Nordsieck, 2007 
 Phuphania globosa Tumpeesuwan, Naggs & Panha, 2007
 Pseudamnicola artanensis Altaba, 2007
 Pseudamnicola meloussensis Altaba, 2007
 Pseudamnicola tramuntanae Altaba, 2007
 Radix jordii Altaba, 2007
 Radix linae Altaba, 2007
 Zoila friendii kostini Lorenz & Chiapponi, 2007 - new subspecies
Other taxa
 genus Phuphania Tumpeesuwan, Naggs & Panha, 2007

2008 

New species
 Albinaria linnei Gittenberger, 2008, one of over a hundred different species within the genus Albinaria
 Brotia mariae Köhler, 2008
 Brotia laodelectata Köhler, 2008
 Bulla arabica Malaquias & Reid, 2008
 Chicoreus jessicae Houart, 2008
 Chilina iguazuensis Gregoric & Rumi, 2008
Conus cakobaui Moolenbeek, Röckel, & Bouchet, 2008
Conus fijiensis Moolenbeek, Röckel, & Bouchet, 2008
Conus fijisulcatus Moolenbeek, Röckel, & Bouchet, 2008
Conus joliveti Moolenbeek, Röckel, & Bouchet, 2008
Conus sutanorcum Moolenbeek, Röckel, & Bouchet, 2008
Falsimargarita terespira Simone, 2008
Gulella systemanaturae Bruggen, 2008, which was named in honor of the 250th anniversary of the publication of Linnaeus’ book Systema Naturae
Helix goderdziana Mumladze, Tarkhnishvili & Pokryszko, 2008, the largest species in the genus Helix
 Nembrotha rosannulata Pola, Cervera & Gosliner, 2008 and Nembrotha aurea Pola, Cervera & Gosliner, 2008
 Opisthostoma vermiculum Clements & Vermeulen, 2008 is unique in that the coiling of its shell displays four different axes of rotation.
 Phyllodesmium koehleri Burghardt, Schrödl & Wägele, 2008
 Phyllodesmium lembehensis Burghardt, Schrödl & Wägele, 2008
 Phyllodesmium lizardensis Burghardt, Schrödl & Wägele, 2008
 Powelliphanta augusta Walker, Trewick & Barker, 2008, a rare endemic snail from New Zealand
Pseudosaphtia brunnea Winter, 2008
Pyrgulopsis blainica Hershler, Liu & Gustafson, 2008
Pyropelta ryukyuensis Sasaki, Okutani & Fujikura, 2008
Selenochlamys ysbryda Rowson & Symondson, 2008, a presumably introduced species found in Wales
 Thapsia ebimimbangana Winter, 2008
 Thapsia wieringai Winter, 2008
 Saphtia granulosa Winter, 2008
 Saphtia lamtoensis Winter, 2008
Other taxa

 family Hokkaidoconchidae Kaim, Jenkins & Warén, 2008, common name hokkaidoconchids, an extinct family of deepwater sea snails.
 genus Pseudosaphtia Winter, 2008
 genus Saphtia Winter, 2008
 genus Vanmolia Winter, 2008

2009

Marine species 
from American Malacological Bulletin:
 Aclis kanela Absalão, 2009
 Adeuomphalus xerente Absalao, 2009
 Calliotropis pataxo Absalão, 2009
 Mirachelus urueuauau Absalão, 2009
 Palazzia pankakare Absalão, 2009
 Ponderinella xacriaba Absalão, 2009

from Journal of Molluscan Studies:
 Gemmuloborsonia clandestina Puillandre, Cruaud & Kantor, 2009

from Novapex:
 Astyris frumarkernorum García, 2009

from Zootaxa:
 Boonea scymnocelata Pimenta, Absalão & Miyaji, 2009
 Depressizona axiosculpta Geiger, 2009. The  second species of these fossil vetigastropods was described from Tonga, and Depressizoninae was updated to the family level as Depressizonidae.
 Echinolittorina placida Reid, 2009 - Two other subgenera Lineolittorina Reid, 2009 and Amerolittorina Reid, 2009 are assigned in the genus Echinolittorina.
 Adalaria slavi Martynov, Korshunova, N. Sanamyan & K. Sanamyan, 2009
 Adalaria olgae Martynov, Korshunova, N. Sanamyan & K. Sanamyan, 2009
 Onchidoris macropompa Martynov, Korshunova, N. Sanamyan & K. Sanamyan, 2009
 Onchimira cavifera Martynov, Korshunova, N. Sanamyan & K. Sanamyan, 2009 and the new genus Onchimira Martynov, Korshunova, N. Sanamyan & K. Sanamyan, 2009
 Phyllodesmium karenae Moore & Gosliner, 2009
 Phyllodesmium pinnatum Moore & Gosliner, 2009
 Phyllodesmium tuberculatum Moore & Gosliner, 2009

from Gloria Maris:
 Rissoina harryleei Rolán & Fernández-Garcés, 2009

from The Raffles Bulletin of Zoology:
 Aiteng ater Swennen & Buatip, 2009; genus Aiteng Swennen & Buatip, 2009; family Aitengidae Swennen & Buatip, 2009

Brackish and freshwater species 
New species
from Zoosystema
Pseudunela espiritusanta Neusser & Schrödl, 2009 This species from Espiritu Santo Island in Vanuatu lives in brackish water while other two ones are marine.

from Molluscan Research
Brotia annamita Köhler, Holford, Do & Ho, 2009
Brotia hoabinhensis Köhler, Holford, Do & Ho, 2009
Sulcospira collyra Köhler, Holford, Do & Ho, 2009
Sulcospira dakrongensis Köhler, Holford, Do & Ho, 2009
Sulcospira quangtriensis Köhler, Holford, Do & Ho, 2009
Sulcospira vietnamensis Köhler, Holford, Do & Ho, 2009

Terrestrial species 
from Journal of Conchology:
Monacha oecali Hausdorf & Páll-Gergely, 2009

from Journal of Molluscan Studies
Limax sarnensis Heim & Nitz, 2009

from Journal of Natural History:
Plagiodontes weyrauchi Pizá & Cazzaniga, 2009

from Zootaxa:
Crikey steveirwini Stanisic, 2009 and new genus Crikey Stanisic, 2009 (family Camaenidae) with only one species, from Australia, named in memory of wildlife expert Steve Irwin

from Zoological Journal of the Linnean Society:
 11 new species of Everettia from Borneo.

from The Beagle:
Torresitrachia alenae Willan, Köhler, Kessner & Braby, 2009
Torresitrachia cuttacutta Willan, Köhler, Kessner & Braby, 2009
Torresitrachia darwini Willan, Köhler, Kessner & Braby, 2009
Torresitrachia wallacei Willan, Köhler, Kessner & Braby, 2009

Fossil species 
from Bulletins of American Paleontology:
 Conus burnetti Hendricks, 2009

from Journal of Conchology:
 Bela trinacria Mariottini & Smriglio, 2009

Discovered but undescribed 

Previously discovered but undescribed gastropod taxa include:
 Various undescribed species of Powelliphanta and one species of Wainuia sp. nov. are known from New Zealand.
 Hauffenia sp. nov. has been a problematic taxon at least since 1996.
 In 1998, an undescribed species of Pseudunela was noted from Lizard Island.

Discovered during this time period but still undescribed (as of 2009) gastropod taxa include:
 This undescribed nudibranch was photographed in 2002 at the Davidson Seamount in depths of 1,497 – 2,342 m. In 2008 it was still not yet described.
 Prophysaon an undescribed species from Siskiyou County, California from the year 2006.

See also 
 List of gastropods described in 2010
 Changes in the taxonomy of gastropods since 2005

References

External links 
 Searching for 2000-2009 in Malacolog Version 4.1.1. A Database of Western Atlantic Marine Mollusca (includes all marine molluscs, not just marine gastropods)

Gastropods